Greek National Road 33 (abbreviated as EO33) is a single carriageway road in southern Greece. It connects Patras with the Greek National Road 74 (Pyrgos - Tripoli) near Levidi, passing through the western and southern foothills of Mount Erymanthos.

Route
The Greek National Road 33 passes through the following places:

Patras 
Ovrya
Stavrodromi
Agia Triada
Panopoulo
Lampeia
Tripotama
Paos
Panagitsa
Vlacherna

33
Roads in Western Greece
Roads in Peloponnese (region)